Kickapoo Site 2 is a unincorporated community on the Kickapoo Reservation in Brown County, Kansas, United States.  As of the 2020 census, the population of the community and nearby areas was 27.

Geography
Kickapoo Site 2 is located in southwest Brown County near the center of the Kickapoo Reservation.

Demographics

For statistical purposes, the United States Census Bureau has defined this community as a census-designated place (CDP).

References

Further reading

External links
 Kansas Kickapoo Tribe official website
 Brown County maps: Current, Historic, KDOT

Census-designated places in Brown County, Kansas
Census-designated places in Kansas
Kickapoo Tribe in Kansas